Fantastica Mania 2011 was the name of two professional wrestling major shows produced that took place on January 22 and January 23, 2011 in Korakuen Hall in Tokyo, Japan. The event was the first ever co-promoted events between Japanese New Japan Pro-Wrestling (NJPW) and the Mexican Consejo Mundial de Lucha Libre (CMLL) and features matches with wrestlers from both promotions and both NJPW and CMLL championships being defended.

On the first night NJPW wrestler Ryusuke Taguchi defeated Máscara Dorada to win the CMLL World Welterweight Championship, marking the first time that a NJPW wrestler had won that particular title. Night one also saw NJPW representatives successfully defend the CMLL World Middleweight Championship and the IWGP Tag Team Championship against CMLL challengers. On night two La Sombra, Máscara Dorada and La Mascara  successfully defended the CMLL World Trios Championship on the undercard while Apollo 55 (Prince Devitt and Ryusuke Taguchi) defeated Golden☆Lovers (Kota Ibushi and Kenny Omega) bringing the IWGP Junior Heavyweight Tag Team Championship back to the promotion after being held by the DDT team since October 2010. Also on night two Tiger Mask defeated longtime rival Tomohiro Ishii in a Lucha de Apuestas, forcing Ishii to have his hair shaved off.

Background
Each of the events featured six professional wrestling matches, some with different wrestlers involved in pre-existing scripted feuds or storylines while other matches were the first time some wrestlers faced off. The Fantastica Mania events was the result of several years of co-operation between New Japan Pro-Wrestling and Consejo Mundial de Lucha Libre, which had seen both companies exchange wrestlers for various events.

Results

January 22

January 23

See also
2011 in professional wrestling

References

2011 in professional wrestling
2011
2011 in Tokyo
January 2011 events in Japan
Professional wrestling in Tokyo